Vrienden (English: "Friends") is a studio album by Dutch artist Jan Smit. It was released on 13 August 2012 through Vosound Records.

Track listing

Charts and certifications

Weekly charts

Year-end charts

Certifications

References

2012 albums
Jan Smit albums